Mimi Cherono Ng'ok (born 1983) is a Kenyan photographer, living in Nairobi. Her "photographs are a visual diary of the experiences and emotions emerging from her itinerant life". Ng'ok's work has been shown at the Hayward Gallery, Berlin Biennale, Carnegie International and African Photography Encounters, and is held in the Walther Collection.

Early life and education
Ng'ok grew up in the rural outskirts of Nairobi, Kenya. In 2006 she graduated with a BFA from the Michaelis School of Fine Art at the University of Cape Town in South Africa.

Photography
Her 2008 series I am Home, on African immigrants living in South Africa, deals with "issues of home, displacement, loss, and identity". A project begun in 2013, made in countries where she has lived and travelled, was described by Alexandra Genova in Time as "a series of vignettes on memory, loss and lust revealed through Ng'ok's experiences." Given that Ng'ok believes home is not a place, but a state of mind, Genova wrote that the work "explores this temporality through the intersection of people and place". Diane Smyth in the British Journal of Photography described Ng'ok's work in an exhibition called Africa State of Mind as giving "a personal interpretation of place, in contrast to the apparently objective lens of documentary photography".

Everyone is Lonely in Kigali was made in Dakar, Accra, Berlin, Abidjan, Kampala, Kigali, Nairobi and Johannesburg and includes her frequently used subject matter: trees, the tropics, horses and an unidentified male figure. The series Do You Miss Me? Sometimes, Not Always, was made over six months after October 2014, in the cities of Kigali, Abidjan, Kampala, and Nairobi in memory of her friend Thabiso Sekgala, who died.

Publications with contributions by Ng'ok
Voices: a Compilation of Testimonials: African Artists Living and Working in Cape Town and Surrounds. Cape Town: African Arts Institute, 2011. Edited by Rucera Seethal. .
Peregrinate: Field Notes on Time Travel and Space. South Africa: Goethe-Institut, 2013. By Ng'ok, Thabiso Sekgala and Musa N. Nxumalo.

Group exhibitions
Peregrinate: Field Notes on Time Travel and Space, Makerere Art Gallery, Makerere University, Kampala, Uganda, 2015. Work by Ng'ok, Thabiso Sekgala and Musa N. Nxumalo.
African Photography Encounters, Bamako, Mali, 2015. Included her series Do You Miss Me? Sometimes, Not Always
Academy of Arts, Berlin, Berlin Biennale, 2018
Carnegie International, Pittsburgh, Pennsylvania, 2018
Africa State of Mind, New Art Exchange, Nottingham, UK, 2018
S'thandwa Sami (My Beloved), Hayward Gallery, London, 2019. Work by Ng'ok and Thabiso Sekgala.

Collections
Ng'ok's work is held in the following permanent collections:
Walther Collection: 30 prints (as of April 2021)

Awards
2017: Winner, Photo London Artproof Award, for her series Everyone is Lonely in Kigali
2017: Grant, Magnum Foundation Fund

References

21st-century women photographers
Artists from Nairobi
Kenyan women artists
Kenyan women photographers
Kenyan photographers
University of Cape Town alumni
Date of birth missing (living people)
Living people
1983 births